The 1989–90 Missouri Tigers men's basketball team represented the University of Missouri as a member of the Big Eight Conference during the 1989–90 NCAA men's basketball season. Led by head coach Norm Stewart, the Tigers won the Big Eight regular season title and were the No. 1 ranked team in the country before an upset by Colorado in the Big Eight Conference Tourney and a stunning loss to 14-seed Northern Iowa in the first round of the NCAA Tourney NCAA tournament. The Tigers finished with an overall record of 26–6 (12–2 Big Eight).

Roster

Schedule and results

 
|-
!colspan=9| Regular season

|-
!colspan=9| Big Eight Conference tournament

|-
!colspan=9| NCAA tournament

Rankings

Awards
Doug Smith – Big Eight Player of the Year, Consensus Second-Team All-American

References

Missouri
Missouri
Missouri Tigers men's basketball seasons